The Osaka Arsenal was a state weapons factory of the Imperial Japanese Army in Osaka during the period from 1870 to 1945.

In the Meiji period, the self-supply of the armed forces with modern weapons was a high concern for the government. The Japanese military leader Ōmura Masujirō proposed to build a garrison with gun and ammunition production facilities at Osaka Castle. The central location of Osaka favored transport routes over land and water. Although Ōmura was the victim of an attack in November 1869, his proposal was nevertheless accepted.

In February 1870, an office for weapons production ( 造 兵 司 , Zōheishi ) was established and in March of the year, the first employees moved into an empty rice warehouse in the northeastern part of the castle Osaka. This was the birth of the Osaka Arsenal. Machines and workers came mainly from the Nagasaki Iron Works.

1871 was renamed the "Office for weapons production Osaka" ( 大阪 造 兵 司 , Ōsaka Zōheishi ), 1872 in "Osaka Factory" ( 大砲 製造 所 , Ōsaka Seizōsho ), 1875 in "Artillery Office of the 2nd Artillery Military District " ( 砲兵 第二方面 内 砲兵 支 廠 , Hōhei Daini Hōmennai Hōhei Shishō ) and finally in 1879 in "Artillery Osaka" as state production center for guns and grenades, while the Arsenal Tokyo was production center for handguns.

During the Satsuma rebellion in 1877, the Arsenal was very active to meet the high demand. Other wars such as the First Sino-Japanese War (1894–1895) and Russo-Japanese War (1904–1905) allowed the arsenal to increase, so that it captured the entire eastern side of the castle grounds.

The staff strength fluctuated strongly; During times of crisis many workers were hired, and then released. This led to tensions with the workforce, especially in December 1906 after the Russo-Japanese War and in October 1919 after the First World War .

During the Pacific War, the workforce of the Arsenal grew steadily, reached over 60,000 employees and developed into one of the largest military factories in the Empire. Towards the end of the war, however, the production yield sank due to material and labor shortages. Osaka became the target of American air strikes from 1945 ; the arsenal was initially only slightly damaged. On August 14, 1945, a day before the capitulation of Japan. However, there was a devastating air raid that destroyed 90% of the arsenal. The death toll on the arsenal site is relatively low at 382 dead, as most of the workers, with the exception of air defense, left the area after the air alarm. The death toll outside the arsenal site is unknown.

With the end of the Pacific War, the 75-year history of the Arsenal came to an end. After the war, the extensive grounds were partially overbuilt by commercial high-rise buildings, and partly used as a park ( Osaka Castle Park).

References

History of Osaka
Imperial Japanese Army
Meiji period
1870 establishments in Japan
1945 disestablishments in Japan